This is a list of awards and nominations received by Itzy, a South Korean girl group formed by JYP Entertainment, since their debut in 2019.

Awards and nominations

Notes

References 

Awards and nominations
Itzy